Welela is an album by the South African musician Miriam Makeba, released in 1989. It was produced primarily by Sipho Mabuse.

Critical reception

The New York Times wrote that "Makeba mixes old and new on Welela, using a polished modern production to carry recent and traditional songs," and deemed "A Luta Continua" "one of the most infectious agitprop songs of the decade."

Track listing
 "Amampondo" (Miriam Makeba) – 5:20
 "African Sunset" (Sipho Mabuse) – 5:49
 "Djiu De Galinha" (José Carlos Schwarz) – 4:08
 "A luta continua" (Makeba) – 4:40
 "Soweto Blues" (Hugh Masekela, S. Todd) – 4:18
 "Welela" (Nelson Lee) – 3:18
 "Hapo Zamani" (Makeba, Dorothy Masuka) – 4:29
 "Pata Pata" (Makeba, Jerry Ragovoy) – 3:53
 "Saduva" (Makeba) – 4:43
 "Africa" (Keith Mathela) – 4:33

Personnel
Miriam Makeba — Lead vocal
Sipho Mabuse, Dorothy Masuka, Doreen Webster — Backing vocals
Keith Mathela — Guitars
Claude Deppa — Trumpet
Claudio Pascoli, Michael "Bami" Rose — Sax
Emmanuel "Chulo" Gatewood — Bass
Damon Duewhite — Drums
Smith Ailar — Percussion
Loulou Laguerre — Keyboards

Production
Produced By Sipho Mabuse & Roberto Meglioli
Post-Production By Allan Goldberg
Recorded & Engineered By Toby Alington & Jean Trenchant
Mixed By Sipho Mabuse & Allan Goldberg

References

Miriam Makeba albums
1989 albums
Mercury Records albums